Zetin-e Olya (also Romanized as Zetīn-e ‘Olyā; also known as Zeytūn) is a village in Zilayi Rural District, Margown District, Boyer-Ahmad County, Kohgiluyeh and Boyer-Ahmad Province, Iran. At the 2006 census, its population was 177, in 33 families.

References 

Populated places in Boyer-Ahmad County